Embark (styled all caps as EMBARK) is the public transit agency of the COTPA (Central Oklahoma Transportation and Parking Authority) trust, the largest transit agency in the state of Oklahoma. Embark has 20 interconnecting bus routes covering the city of Oklahoma City and parts of the Oklahoma City Metropolitan Area, including weekday Express service from Norman Norman to Downtown Oklahoma City. Embark also operates paratransit, the Oklahoma City Streetcar, downtown public parking, bike share, and river ferry service. Additionally, Embark provides administrative and executive support for the Regional Transportation Authority of Central Oklahoma. 

History 
The Central Oklahoma Transportation and Parking Authority was established on February 1, 1966 by the Oklahoma City Council to continue transit service as private operator Oklahoma Transportation Company, which provided bus service to the community, as City Bus Company, had announced it would discontinue transit service due to low ridership. There were initially only 18 buses, all leased from the Oklahoma Transportation Company (OTC).

The system was rebranded as MassTrans in 1975 and used that name until 1992, when it was rebranded as Metro Transit, though the official name remains in use as well.

COTPA was reorganized in 1989, when the city established a Transit Services division to provide senior management through an inter-local operating agreement. COTPA also purchased the historic Union Station in Downtown Oklahoma City, which served as an administrative office until 2022.

Embark previously operated "Oklahoma Spirit Trolleys", a trolley-replica bus network from 1999 to 2020.

Oklahoma City's downtown transit center at N.W. 4th St. and Hudson Ave. opened to customers in 2004 after the previous transit hub was demolished to make way for construction of the Paycom Center.

In September 2013, it was announced that Metro Transit would change its name to Embark, effective April 28, 2014, and include a new bus route system. 

On October 15, 2015, Embark announced that it would begin offering free Wi-Fi on all buses, on all routes.

In August 2016, Embark received the award for "North America's Outstanding Public Transportation System" by the American Public Transportation Association for systems providing fewer than 4 million annual passenger trips.

In December 2018, Embark began operation of Oklahoma City Streetcar, the state's only modern streetcar system, which services a nearly five-mile route in the urban core. 

Since January 27, 2019, for the first time in Oklahoma City public transportation history, Sunday bus service was implemented and the routes and schedules will be the same as it on Saturdays. Effective Monday, September 2, 2019 (Labor Day 2019), Embark buses were scheduled to operate on all major holidays, which meant public transportation in Oklahoma City would operate 365 days a year for the first time in its history. The holiday schedule was to be the same as that of Saturdays and Sundays.

In 2022, Embark broke ground on construction of RAPID NW, Oklahoma City's first Bus Rapid Transit service.

Fares 
No fare to kids below 7 with fare-paying rider; limit 3. Line 50, the Downtown Discovery, besides the new streetcars, is $1 for regular or $0.5 for special patrons. All buses have driver shields to minimise interaction.

Oklahoma City local fare 
Regular: $1.75 – Special Patron: $0.75

Express service 
Regular: $3 – Special Patron: $1.50
One express route serves Norman on Monday through Friday only.  Service in the City of Edmond will no longer be provided by Embark effective June 30, 2009.  The City of Edmond's new Citylink service began July 1, 2009.

Passes 
All rolling passes are for both local & express, besides the streetcars, and for unlimited travel.
Annual Passes – Regular: $600 – Special Patron - $300
30-Day Passes – Regular: $50 – Special Patron: $25
24-Hour Passes – Regular: $4 – Special Patron: $2
7-Day Passes – Regular: $14 – Special Patron: $7

Routes 
Embark currently operates fixed-route bus service in Oklahoma City and bus routes Norman that were previously operated by Cleveland Area Rapid Transit, along with an express route between Norman and Downtown Oklahoma City.

Oklahoma City routes 

2 Coltrane (was 2 Miramar/NE 23rd & Lottie before April 28, 2014, when it extended over parts of Route 19 and Route 1)
3 N Kelly (was 3 Park Estates/NE 10th & Lincoln before April 28, 2014)
5 Memorial Rd (was 5 Quail Springs/NW 63rd & Western before April 28, 2014)
7 N May (was 7 N May/NW 63 & Independence before April 28, 2014)
8 N Penn/NW 63rd (was 8 French Market/Wilshire & Lyrewood Ln before April 28, 2014)
9 Reno Crosstown (was 9 Reno/Reno & May before April 28, 2014)
10 N Portland (was 10 N Portland/NW 16th & Penn before April 28, 2014)
11 29th St Crosstown (was 11 Airport/Oak Grove/SW 44th & Independence/S Meridian before April 28, 2014)
12 S May (was 12 OKC Community College/SW 29th & May before April 28, 2014)
13 S Western/I-240 Crosstown (was 13 SW 74th & S Western before April 28, 2014)
14 SE Bryant/Sunnylane (was 14 SE OKC/SE 59th & Sunnylane before April 28, 2014, but was rerouted over Route 20; the old route to the east became part of Route 11)
15 Midwest City (was 15 Midwest City/Reno & Douglas before April 28, 2014)
16 S Pennsylvania (was 16 Exchange/SW 89th & Penn before April 28, 2014)
18 Lincoln (was 18 State Capitol/NE 13th & Lincoln/Musgrave before April 28, 2014)
19 Spencer (was 19 Green Pastures/NE OK County/NE 39th & Hiwassee before April 28, 2014)
22 Martin Luther King (was 22 ML King Blvd/Zoo/Remington Park before April 28, 2014)
23 23rd St Crosstown (was 23 N 23 St Crosstown/NW 10th & Council before April 28, 2014)
23N 23rd St Night
24 Norman Express
38 10th St Crosstown (was 38 Fairgrounds/NW 10th & MacArthur before April 28, 2014)
40 S Walker (was 40 S Walker/SW 104th & Santa Fe before April 28, 2014)

Norman routes 
The Embark Norman Transfer Station is currently located on Brooks Street, just east of Gaylord Family Oklahoma Memorial Stadium on the University of Oklahoma campus. A new transit center in downtown Norman is currently under construction by the City of Norman. 
110 Main Street
110 Lindsey East
112 Lindsey West
120 West Norman Link
121 Alameda/E. Norman
144 Social Security (Operates only when Moore Social Security office is open)

Former routes 
1 Garden Day/NE 23 & Bryant (discontinued on April 28, 2014 due to low ridership; eastern loop replaced by extended Route 2)
4 Belle Isle/NW 23rd & Walker (discontinued on April 28, 2014 due to low ridership with the northwesternmost portion transferred to Route 5)
6
17
20 SE OKC/Crossroads/SE 74th & Shields (discontinued on April 28, 2014; replaced by rerouted Route 14)
21
25 S. 44th St Crosstown/S. Meridian (discontinued July 21, 2003)
26 Northwest Expressway/County Line Rd. & Britton (discontinued August 2, 2004)
29 Airport/NW 50th & Portland (discontinued June 25, 2007; Routes 10 and 11 extended to serve the ends of the route)
37 Edmond Express/Oklahoma City (discontinued June 30, 2009)
39 Edmond Local/Oklahoma City (discontinued August 2, 2004)
50 The CIRC (Transit Center, Bricktown, Bass Pro Shops, Bricktown Landing, discontinued in 2020)
80 Eastern OK County (discontinued July 20, 2008)
81 NW Area Neighborhoods (discontinued on April 28, 2014)
82 Southwest Area (Became 83 Southwest Area by 2011 due to restructuring; discontinued on April 28, 2014)
82 (served the northeast area; discontinued on April 28, 2014)
83 Southeast Area (Became 84 Southeast Area by 2011 due to restructuring; discontinued on April 28, 2014)
84 Shep. Mall – St Anthony – MetroTech (discontinued on June 30, 2009 due to restructuring)
85 West Area (Eliminated by 2011 due to restructuring)

Link 
An unusual aspect of Embark was the Link program, which is a combination of owl service and paratransit service. Since regularly scheduled routes operate only until about 8pm local time, and not at all Sundays, Link provides nominally fixed route service from 7 pm until 12 midnight Monday through Saturday, and Sunday from 7 am until 7 pm. The four routes may however, deviate by as much as three-quarters of a mile from the fixed route if the customer notifies Embark by 4 pm the day before (or by 12 noon Saturday for Monday service). An additional fee will be charged in that instance, but customers using the fixed stops will be charged the normal fare.
The Link was discontinued in April 2014 as Embark began extending hours on 5 routes (see below), as well as adding Sunday and holiday service on most bus routes in 2019.

See also 
Oklahoma City Streetcar

References

External links 

Embark
Embark Norman

Bus transportation in Oklahoma
Transit agencies in Oklahoma
Transportation in Oklahoma City